The Delta 5000 series was an American expendable launch system which was used to conduct an orbital launch in 1989. It was a member of the Delta family of rockets. Although several variants were put forward, only the Delta 5920 was launched. The designation used a four digit numerical code to store information on the configuration of the rocket. It was built from a combination of spare parts left over from earlier Delta rockets, which were being retired, and parts from the Delta II 6000-series, which was just entering service.

The first stage was the RS-27 powered Extended Long Tank Thor, flown on several earlier Delta rockets. Nine Castor-4A solid rocket boosters were attached to increase thrust at lift-off, replacing the less powerful Castor-4 boosters used on the 3000 series. The Delta-K was used as a second stage. In the configuration that was launched, no third stage was flown.

The Delta 5000 was launched just once, from Space Launch Complex 2W at the Vandenberg Air Force Base. Launch occurred at 14:34 on 18 November 1989. It was successful, and placed the Cosmic Background Explorer (COBE) spacecraft into low Earth orbit.

Payload

References

Delta (rocket family)